Norfolk Glacier is a glacier, 12 nautical miles (22 km) long, draining westward from Wisconsin Range to enter Reedy Glacier between mounts Soyat and Bolton. Mapped by United States Geological Survey (USGS) from surveys and U.S. Navy air photos, 1960–64. Named by Advisory Committee on Antarctic Names (US-ACAN) after Norfolk, VA, location of Detachment Three, the Meteorological Support Unit of the U.S. Naval Support Force, Antarctica.

References

Glaciers of Marie Byrd Land